The Trummerflora Collective is an independent group of music makers that embrace the pluralistic nature of creative music and provides an atmosphere that nurtures the creative development of its members.

"Trummerflora, or rubble plants and trees, are a special phenomenon unique to heavily-bombed urban areas. The bomb acts as a plow, mixing rubble fragments with the earth, which often contain seeds dormant for a century or more. These seeds come to light and those that can live in this new and special earth grow and flourish."
-Helen and Newton Harrison

The Trummerflora Collective uses the energy of this concept to create a fertile, varied, self-sustaining environment for the Southern California experimental and improvised music scene. The collaboration of sympathetic artists, producers, fans, and venues will grow a community that can emerge from the rubble.

History
Based on a mutual desire to provide a network of support for San Diego's experimental and improvised music community Hans Fjellestad, Marcos Fernandes, Damon Holzborn, Robert Montoya, Marcelo Radulovich and Jason Robinson (musician) formed the Trummerflora Collective in the Spring of 2000.

The collective concept grew out of a sequence of collaborations beginning with Trummerflora at the Casbah, a concert series started in 1999 ; "...and the reindeer you rode in on," a holiday CD released also in 1999; and trummerflora.com, a resource site for experimental and improvised music launched in 2000.

Following their official announcement in May 2000, the TFC continued to grow as a performing and organizing collective, curating a new series, Trummerflora Mondays at Galoka, and welcomed Nathan Hubbard to the group in November of that year.

In April 2001, the TFC released "No Stars Please," a collection of live recordings made during their first year, and appeared in The Wire's Global Ear column. They enlisted two new members Kristy Cheadle and Joscha Oetz in the Fall.

The TFC presented the first Spring Reverb, an annual festival of music and art at the Spruce Street Forum in April 2002 and launched their most successful series, “Other Ideas at the Space”, in November. Lisle Ellis and Ellen Weller joined the ranks while Kristy Cheadle relocated to Madison, Wisconsin.

In 2003, the collective broadened its nominal focus from "improvised and experimental" to "creative music," which more accurately represented the diverse nature of Trummerflora artists and the musical communities that they engage with. The TFC concentrated on organizational activities, presenting the second Spring Reverb at the Museum of Contemporary Art San Diego in May, and continuing their Other Ideas series. Al Scholl became a member during this year.

The TFC released "Rubble 1," a compilation CD featuring both individual and ensemble works, to coincide with Spring Reverb 2004. The Other Ideas series moved to a new home at Voz Alta, a downtown performance and gallery space, and the group inducted Curtis Glatter and Scott Walton.

In January 2005, TFC became collective in residence at Voz Alta Project and celebrated their 5th anniversary at Spring Reverb which included three nights of performances and a visual art exhibit. In August, Tracy McMullen joined the collective.

Current members
Marcos Fernandes
Curtis Glatter
Damon Holzborn
Nathan Hubbard
James Ilgenfritz
Sam Lopez
Joscha Oetz
Marcelo Radulovich
Jason Robinson (musician)
Scott Walton
Ellen Weller

Past members
Kristy Cheadle
Lisle Ellis
Hans Fjellestad
Tracy McMullen
Robert Montoya
Al Scholl

Discography
Trummerflora Collective, "...and the reindeer you rode in on" (1999/Accretions)
Trummerflora Collective, "No Stars Please" (2001/Accretions/Circumvention Music)
Trummerflora Collective, "Rubble 1" (2004/Accrestions/Circumvention Music)
Trummerflora Collective, "Rubble 2" (2006/Accretions/Circumvention Music)

References

External links
Trummerflora Collective official website
Trummerflora Collective at MySpace

Musical groups from San Diego